Trabajador was a  tug launched in 1931 from the Hong Kong and Whampoa Dock for Visayan Stevedore-Transportation Company and registered as a United States vessel in Iloilo, Philippines.

Commercial service
In 1935 the Trabajador took part in a rescue of survivors from the British freighter  that was wrecked in San Bernardino Strait. Of 54 passengers and crew, 52 were rescued.

United States Navy service
The tug was commandeered by United States Navy and assigned to the 16th Naval District on 13 December 1941 under command of Lt. (jg.) Trose E. Donaldson, USNR as the war came to the Philippines. Although not formally commissioned by the U.S. Navy, she served as a patrol boat tender in Manila Bay with the Base Section of the Navy's Inshore Patrol.

With the move of Motor Torpedo Boat Squadron Three to Sisiman Bay on the Bataan Peninsula the tug became tender to the PT boat squadron. For a brief time she was the "luxury" vessel for the PTs with a real galley, wardroom and a mess boy who baked pies. After the squadron had left with General MacArthur as a passenger thirty-two men were left behind including Lt. (jg.) Edward G. DeLong who assumed command of Trabajador on 25 February 1942. DeLong left Corregidor on 2 May and made it to Mindanao where he was later captured and executed in prison camp.

Trabajador was sunk on 10 April 1942, most likely by Japanese artillery near Corregidor, and was awarded a battle star.

Resolute
The tug remained on the bottom of Manila Bay until after the end of World War II. When she was salvaged she was renamed Resolute and continued operations in the Philippines into the late 1970s.

Footnotes

References

Sources

External links
Daily Trojan page image with Silver Hazel rescue story.

1931 ships
Ships built in Hong Kong
Merchant ships of the Philippines
World War II naval ships of the United States
Maritime incidents in 1942